David Howell Turner (May 10, 1885 – May 11, 1957) was a politician from Alabama. He was Secretary of State of Alabama from 1935 to 1939 and 1943 to 1944. He also served as State Auditor of Alabama from 1939 to 1943.

He was born on May 10, 1885, in Camden, AL. He attended the University of Alabama. In 1944, he resigned as Secretary of State to accept an appointment as chairman of the Board of Pardons and Paroles.

He married on December 18, 1913, and had three children. He died on May 11, 1957.

References

1885 births
1957 deaths
Alabama Democrats